The fourth season of The Walking Dead, an American post-apocalyptic horror television series on AMC, premiered on October 13, 2013, and concluded on March 30, 2014, consisting of 16 episodes. Developed for television by Frank Darabont, the series is based on the eponymous series of comic books by Robert Kirkman, Tony Moore, and Charlie Adlard. It was executive produced by Kirkman, David Alpert, Scott M. Gimple, Greg Nicotero, Tom Luse, and Gale Anne Hurd, with Gimple assuming the role of showrunner after Glen Mazzara's departure from the series. The fourth season was well received by critics. It was nominated for multiple awards and won three, including Best Syndicated/Cable Television Series for the second consecutive year, at the 40th Saturn Awards.

This season adapts material from issues #40–61 of the comic book series and introduces notable comic characters, including Bob Stookey (Lawrence Gilliard Jr.), Sgt. Abraham Ford (Michael Cudlitz), Dr. Eugene Porter (Josh McDermitt) and Rosita Espinosa (Christian Serratos), as well as the Chambler Family, a modified version of the Chalmers Family from a tie-in novel, The Walking Dead: Rise of the Governor.

The season continues the story of Rick Grimes (Andrew Lincoln) and his group of survivors as they continue to survive in a post-apocalyptic world invaded by flesh-eating zombies, dubbed "walkers". Set several months after the attack on the prison by The Governor (David Morrissey) and his army, Rick has renounced his leadership in order to live a quiet and more peaceful life in contrast to his cold-hearted nature in the previous season. Striving to hold onto humanity, Rick and his fellow survivors struggle to maintain their close to an ideal life at the prison as problems arise in the face of new evil, and threats within and outside the premises, including a deadly flu strain and the return of the vengeful Governor.

Production
A fourth season of the show, consisting of 16 episodes, was confirmed in December 2012. Production began in Senoia, Georgia on May 6, 2013. In July 2013, it was reported that David S. Goyer would be directing the penultimate episode of the season, however Goyer did not direct the episode due to scheduling conflicts. Greg Nicotero, who replaced Goyer, directed three episodes for the season, while Tricia Brock and Ernest Dickerson each directed two episodes. Michelle MacLaren returned this season to direct the season finale, after previously directing episodes in seasons one and two. Comic book co-creator Robert Kirkman wrote two episodes of the season. Filming was completed on November 23, 2013.

Inspirations
In an interview with showrunner Scott Gimple, he shares: "The ultimate inspiration for The Walking Dead is the comic book. Sometimes, we can go far away from the comic book story, but often we ultimately serve the comic book story. And even when we go far away from it, we're inspired by it - and the novels as well. And then beyond that, all of the great stuff that we have consumed along the way, from zombie movies to Star Wars to other comics to really highbrow movies like The Grand Illusion to Jaws. And also really, world history. The plague storyline was inspired by both Camus' The Plague and other stories about the plague I heard in Edinburgh. But really, it starts with the comic book."

Webisodes
Following the two previous web series in 2011 and 2012, another set of webisodes titled The Oath was released on October 1, 2013.

Talking Dead

A third season of the live talk show aired alongside the fourth season of The Walking Dead.

Cast

Main cast
 
 
 

The fourth season features thirteen series regulars, with nine actors receiving opening credits billing, while four others are credited as "Also starring". Melissa McBride and Scott Wilson, who portray Carol Peletier and Hershel Greene, respectively, were added in the opening sequence after previously being credited as "Also starring". David Morrissey, who plays The Governor, is not credited among the main cast until his reappearance in the episode "Live Bait". Credited as "Also starring" are Emily Kinney (Beth Greene), Chad L. Coleman (Tyreese Williams), and Sonequa Martin-Green (Sasha Williams), who were promoted from recurring status, and Lawrence Gilliard Jr., who joins the main cast as Bob Stookey. Wilson and Morrissey were both removed from the opening credits, and as series regulars after the episode "After". However, Wilson was re-added to the opening credits and as a series regular for the season finale, "A".

Starring
 Andrew Lincoln as Rick Grimes, the series' protagonist, the father of Carl and Judith, and a former sheriff's deputy, who recently relinquished his leadership over the survivor group out of disgust towards his own previous actions as leader.
 Norman Reedus as Daryl Dixon, an antihero-like Southern redneck, who is also the group's primary hunter and has a strong bond with Carol, and later forms a bond with Beth.
 Steven Yeun as Glenn Rhee, a former pizza delivery man married to Maggie Greene, who has matured over the series.
 Lauren Cohan as Maggie Greene, Hershel's elder daughter, Beth's half-sister, and Glenn's wife, who is a determined, fierce and capable fighter.
 Chandler Riggs as Carl Grimes, Rick's adolescent son. Brave to a fault, Carl begins to develop a callous mentality in response to the lethal landscape of a savage, new world. However he is also emotionally conflicted with himself because of the brutality of his previous choices in the new world.
 Danai Gurira as Michonne, a quiet and meticulous, yet fierce woman, who has recently joined Rick's group. She has begun to bond with the group, and shares a close bond with Rick's son Carl but is still fierce and secretive of her past.
 Melissa McBride as Carol Peletier, a former victim of domestic abuse, who has empowered herself but has come to make several dark and questionable decisions for the good of her group. She is the only known female Atlanta camp survivor left.
 Scott Wilson as Hershel Greene, a religious former veterinarian and farmer, who is protective of his daughters. He maintains his faith despite many tragic events and acts as the group's primary moral compass as well as a surrogate father figure to Rick and Glenn.
 David Morrissey as The Governor, the former leader of the now-abandoned Woodbury and a primary threat to the prison community, and the primary antagonist of the first half of the season, who is now calling himself "Brian Heriot". Having become alarmed of his cold ways he is attempting to redeem himself by caring for a family he encounters.

Also starring
 Emily Kinney as Beth Greene, a soft-spoken teenage girl, Hershel's younger daughter, and Maggie's younger half-sister. Beth has become emotionally numb but is secretly still emotionally fragile, and later forms a bond with Daryl.
 Chad L. Coleman as Tyreese Williams, Sasha's peace-keeping older brother and one of the few survivors of Woodbury and Karen's boyfriend.
 Sonequa Martin-Green as Sasha Williams, Tyreese's younger sister, who is seemingly fiery, ruthless and cold but deep down is a compassionate young woman. She has also developed an attraction to Bob.
 Lawrence Gilliard Jr. as Bob Stookey, a former army medic, who struggles to recover from alcoholism. He also develops an attraction to Sasha.

Supporting cast

The Prison
 Brighton Sharbino as Lizzie Samuels, a young girl, who has joined the prison community and suffers from psychological problems and obsessed with walkers.
 Kyla Kenedy as Mika Samuels, Lizzie's younger sister, who has also joined the prison community.
 Sunkrish Bala as Dr. Caleb Subramanian, a doctor, who has joined the prison community and is more commonly known as "Dr. S".
 Luke Donaldson as Luke, a young boy, who has joined the prison community.
 Sherry Richards as Jeanette, a former Woodbury resident, who has joined the prison community.
 Vincent Martella as Patrick, a young teenager, who has joined the prison community.
 Melissa Ponzio as Karen, Tyreese's new love interest and the lone survivor of the Woodbury army massacre.
 Kennedy Brice as Molly, a young girl, who develops a friendship with Lizzie, Mika, and Luke.
 Victor McCay as Ryan Samuels, Lizzie and Mika's father.
 Kyle Gallner as Zach, a survivor, who has joined the prison community and forms a relationship with Beth.

Chambler family 
 Alanna Masterson as Tara Chambler, a police academy attendee, who was surviving with her family before encountering The Governor.
 Audrey Marie Anderson as Lilly Chambler, a former nurse, Meghan's mother, and Tara's sister, who develops a relationship with The Governor.
 Danny Vinson as David Chambler, is the father of Tara and Lily and the grandfather of Meghan who suffers from terminal cancer.
 Meyrick Murphy as Meghan Chambler, Lilly's daughter, who begins to see The Governor as a father figure.

Martinez's camp
 Jose Pablo Cantillo as Caesar Martinez, one of The Governor's most trusted allies, who leads a new group of survivors.
 Kirk Acevedo as Mitch Dolgen, a former tank operator, who has joined Martinez's new group.
 Juliana Harkavy as Alisha, a former member of the army reserves, who forms a relationship with Tara.
 Enver Gjokaj as Pete Dolgen, a member of Martinez's group and Mitch's brother.

Abraham's group
 Michael Cudlitz as Sgt. Abraham Ford, a former soldier trying to get Eugene to Washington, D.C. so he can stop the outbreak.
 Christian Serratos as Rosita Espinosa, a young Hispanic woman, who is Abraham's girlfriend.
 Josh McDermitt as Dr. Eugene Porter, a scientist, who claims to know what caused the outbreak and is being escorted by Abraham and Rosita to government officials in Washington, D.C.

The Claimers
 Jeff Kober as Joe, leader of a small group of heavily armed marauders called the "Claimers", who live by the philosophy of "claiming" and the primary antagonist of the second half of the season.
 Davi Jay as Tony, a right-hand of Joe and member of Joe's group.
 Marcus Hester as Len, a hostile member of Joe's group, who forms an antagonism with Daryl.
 Keith Brooks as Dan, a sexually deviant of Joe's group.
 Scott Dale as Lou, a member of Joe's group, the first one who faces Rick.
 J. D. Evermore as Harley, a member of Joe's group.
 Eric Mendenhall as Billy, a ruthless member of Joe's group.

Terminus
 Denise Crosby as Mary, a resident of Terminus, who greets survivors that arrive there.
 Andrew J. West as Gareth, the mysterious leader of Terminus.
 Tate Ellington as Alex, a member of Terminus.

Miscellaneous
 Kerry Condon as Clara, a mysterious woman Rick encounters in the forest.
 Robin Lord Taylor as Sam, a survivor encountered by Rick and Carol.
 Brina Palencia as Ana, a survivor traveling with Sam, who is encountered by Rick and Carol.
 Aldis Hodge as Mike, Michonne's former boyfriend, who appears in a flashback.
 Brandon Fobbs as Terry, Michonne's former friend, who appears in a flashback.

Lennie James was initially reported to return as Morgan Jones, Rick's first human encounter in the apocalypse, however showrunner Scott M. Gimple confirmed that he would not appear in the fourth season, saying that he was misquoted. Despite this, Gimple stated that Morgan would return in later seasons. Morgan eventually returned in the series' fifth season.

Episodes

Reception

Critical response
The fourth season of The Walking Dead has been well received from critics. On Metacritic, the season holds a score of 75 out of 100, indicating "generally favorable reviews", based on 16 critics. On Rotten Tomatoes, the season holds an 81% with an average rating of 7.60 out of 10 based on 32 reviews. The site's critical consensus reads: "Consistently thrilling, with solid character development and enough gore to please grindhouse fans, this season of The Walking Dead continues to demonstrate why it's one of the best horror shows on television."

Accolades

For the 40th Saturn Awards, the fourth season of The Walking Dead received four nominations and three wins. The wins were for Best Syndicated/Cable Television Series, Best Supporting Actress on Television (Melissa McBride), and Best Performance by a Younger Actor in a Television Series (Chandler Riggs). The only other nomination was for Best Guest Starring Role on Television (David Morrissey).

The season also received two nominations for the 66th Primetime Creative Arts Emmy Awards: Outstanding Sound Editing for a Series ("Too Far Gone") and Outstanding Special Visual Effects in a Supporting Role ("30 Days Without an Accident"). Additionally, the season was also nominated for Outstanding Performance by a Stunt Ensemble in a Television Series at the 20th and 21st Screen Actors Guild Awards for both halves of the season, respectively. Melissa McBride was nominated for Best Supporting Actress in a Drama Series at the 4th Critics' Choice Television Awards.

Ratings

Home media releases
The fourth season was released on region 1/A DVD and Blu-ray on August 26, 2014. It was also released in limited edition Blu-ray packaging, a replica of the tree walker (featured in the episode "Isolation"), designed by Greg Nicotero and sculpted by McFarlane Toys. Special features include "Inside The Walking Dead" and "The Making of The Walking Dead" featurettes for every episode; six other featurettes titled, "Drawing Inspiration", "Hershel", "The Governor is Back", "Society, Science & Survival", "Inside KNB Studios" and "A Journey Back to Brutality"; deleted scenes from eight episodes; and audio commentaries on six episodes; and two extended episodes. Also, the final line of the season is uncensored, with Rick saying "They're fucking with the wrong people". This uncensored line change was added to the finale itself, unlike similar changes in the future taking the space of a secondary version of the episode inside bonus features.

References

External links

 
 

2013 American television seasons
2014 American television seasons
04